The russet-mantled softtail (Thripophaga berlepschi) is a species of bird in the family Furnariidae. It is endemic to Peru.

Its natural habitat is subtropical or tropical moist montane forest. It is threatened by habitat loss.

References

External links
BirdLife Species Factsheet.

russet-mantled softtail
Birds of the Peruvian Andes
Endemic birds of Peru
russet-mantled softtail
Taxonomy articles created by Polbot
Taxobox binomials not recognized by IUCN